J19: The Journal of Nineteenth-Century Americanists is a semiannual peer-reviewed academic journal which covers research on and analysis of the "long nineteenth century" (1783-1914). It is the official publication of C19: The Society of Nineteenth-Century Americanists. The journal is published by the University of Pennsylvania Press. In addition to the print version, current issues are available electronically through Project MUSE.

The editors-in-chief are Elizabeth Duquette (Gettysburg College) and Stacey Margolis (University of Utah).

References

External links 

 
 Journal page on Project MUSE
 C19: The Society of Nineteenth-Century Americanists

History of the United States journals
Literary magazines published in the United States
Publications established in 2013
Biannual journals
English-language journals
University of Pennsylvania Press academic journals